MFZB (abbreviation of Motherfucking Zebrahead, Bitch) is the fourth studio album released by American punk rock band Zebrahead. "Rescue Me" was released to radio on January 20, 2004.

The title of the album originally comes from the band's fanclub of the same name. The first 1,000 copies of the CD release of it were made available in four different colors; red, yellow, green and blue, with blue being the official color with later copies.

The songs "Falling Apart" and "Alone" were featured in the video game, WWE SmackDown! vs. Raw and its GameCube counterpart, WWE Day of Reckoning.

Singles
"Into You" - released as the lead single from the album in Japan in late 2003, its accompanied music video is a combination of concert and amateur "behind-the-scenes" footage from the band while on tour. It also has scenes with the band taking photo with fans and studio recording of the song.
"Rescue Me" - released as the first single from the album in the U.S and second in Japan/ overall in early 2004, its accompanied music video is recorded footage of the band performing the song at a concert.
"Falling Apart" - released as a radio-only single in spring 2004.
"Hello Tomorrow'" - the fourth and final single off the album as released in the summer of 2004, a music video accompanied its release.

Track listing

Personnel
Ali Tabatabaee – lead vocals
Justin Mauriello – lead vocals, rhythm guitar
Greg Bergdorf – lead guitar, backing vocals
Ben Osmundson – bass guitar, backing vocals
Ed Udhus – drums, percussion

References

External links
Zebrahead
MFZB

Zebrahead albums
2003 albums
Columbia Records albums